Leporinus britskii is a species of Leporinus found in the Rio Tapajós and the Rio Jari drainages in Brazil in South America. This species can reach a length of  SL.

Etymology
It is named in honor of Heraldo A. Britski of the Universidade de São Paulo, for his contribution to the knowledge of Neotropical fishes, and especially for his participation in the understanding of Leporinus taxonomy.

References

Taxa named by Francimário da Silva Feitosa
Taxa named by Geraldo Mendes dos Santos
Taxa named by José Luis Olivan Birindelli
Taxa described in 2011
Fish described in 2011
Anostomidae
Freshwater fish of Brazil